Katalin "Kata" Maria Menczinger (born 17 January 1989 in Budapest) is a Hungarian former water polo player. At the 2012 Summer Olympics, she competed for the Hungary women's national water polo team in the women's event. She is 5 ft 10 inches tall. She also competed at the 2011 World Aquatics Championships.

See also
 List of World Aquatics Championships medalists in water polo

References

External links
 

Hungarian female water polo players
1989 births
Living people
Olympic water polo players of Hungary
Water polo players at the 2012 Summer Olympics
World Aquatics Championships medalists in water polo
Universiade medalists in water polo
Water polo players from Budapest
Universiade silver medalists for Hungary
Medalists at the 2017 Summer Universiade
21st-century Hungarian women